Bjørn Einar Romøren (born 1 April 1981) is a Norwegian former ski jumper who competed at World Cup level from 2001 to 2014. His career highlights include eight individual World Cup wins, two ski flying world records, and a team bronze medal at the 2006 Winter Olympics. Bjørn Einar is the younger brother of Jan-Erik Romøren, best known by the stage name Nag, frontman of black metal band Tsjuder.

Career
Romøren achieved his first World Cup victory in Bischofshofen during the 2002–03 Four Hills Tournament. He later won several more World Cup competitions as well as two World Championship bronze medals in the team large hill event in Val di Fiemme (2003) and Oberstdorf (2005). At the 2006 Winter Olympics in Pragelato, Romøren won a bronze medal in the team large hill event. He also has four medals in the team event at the Ski Flying World Championships with two golds (2004 in Planica; 2006 in Kulm), one silver (2010 in Planica) and a bronze (2008 in Oberstdorf).

On 20 March 2005 in Planica, Romøren set the world record for the sport's longest jump with a distance of 234.5 metres which he later improved to 239 m on the same day. This record stood until 11 February 2011 (during which countryman Johan Remen Evensen jumped 243 m in Vikersund), but his 239 m jump remained the hill record at Planica until 20 March 2015, exactly a decade to the day.

World Cup

Standings

Wins

Ski jumping world records

References

External links
 
 
 Video of Romøren's 239 m world record jump at YouTube

|-

1981 births
Living people
Norwegian male ski jumpers
Olympic bronze medalists for Norway
Olympic ski jumpers of Norway
Ski jumpers at the 2006 Winter Olympics
Ski jumpers at the 2010 Winter Olympics
Olympic medalists in ski jumping
FIS Nordic World Ski Championships medalists in ski jumping
Medalists at the 2006 Winter Olympics
World record setters in ski flying
Skiers from Oslo
21st-century Norwegian people